Maciej Kaczorowski (born 20 June 1980) is a retired Polish football striker.

References

1980 births
Living people
Polish footballers
Legia Warsaw players
Pogoń Szczecin players
Arka Gdynia players
GKS Bełchatów players
Ruch Chorzów players
FSV Optik Rathenow players
Flota Świnoujście players
Association football forwards
Polish expatriate footballers
Expatriate footballers in Germany
Polish expatriate sportspeople in Germany